Events from the year 1663 in France

Incumbents
 Monarch – Louis XIV

Events
The Académie des Inscriptions et Belles-Lettres is founded
Construction of the Church of Saint-Just, Lyon is completed
The Prix de Rome scholarship is established for students of the arts

Births

16 March – Jean-Baptiste Matho, composer (d 1743)
25 March – Félix Le Pelletier de La Houssaye, statesman (d. 1723)
2 June – Anne-Marguerite Petit du Noyer, journalist (d. 1719)
24 June – Jean Baptiste Massillon, Roman Catholic bishop and famous preacher (d. 1742)
26 July – Louis Carré, mathematician (d. 1711)
5 August – Charles-Armand de Gontaut, duc de Biron, military leader (d. 1756)
31 August – Guillaume Amontons, scientific instrument inventor and physicist (d. 1705) 
1 September – Jean Boivin the Younger, writer, scholar and translator (d. 1726)
20 September – Louis-François Duplessis de Mornay, prelate (d. 1741)
18 October – Prince Eugene of Savoy, military commander (d. 1736)
14 December – Jean de Forcade de Biaix (d. 1729)

Full date missing
Jacques Adam, translator (d. 1735)
Louis Deseschaliers, actor
Jean-Baptiste Labat, clergyman, botanist, writer, explorer, ethnographer, soldier, engineer and landowner (d. 1738)
Louis Laguerre, painter (d. 1721)
Louis Le Pelletier, linguist (d. 1733)
Raveneau de Lussan, buccaneer
Pierre-Denis Martin, painter (d. 1742)

Deaths

11 may – Henri II d'Orléans, Duke of Longueville (b. 1595)
5 June – Béatrix de Cusance, baroness (b. 1614)
20 June – Catherine Henriette de Bourbon, Légitimée de France, Duchess of Elbeuf (b. 1596)
31 October – Théophile Raynaud, Jesuit theologian and writer (b. 1583)
27 December – Christine of France, Duchess of Savoy (b. 1606)

Full date missing
Gauthier de Costes, seigneur de la Calprenède, novelist and dramatist (b. 1609 or 1610)
Claude de Bourdeille, comte de Montrésor, aristocrat and Count of Montrésor (born c. 1606)

See also

References

1660s in France